The Descendants of John VI of Portugal, of the House of Braganza, would play a role in Portuguese imperial affairs, global royalty, and major historical events of their time. John's marriage to Carlota Joaquina of Spain, which was not a content one, produced many children which would be key players in the world at their time.
 
His descendants can be found in both reigning and non-reigning royal families of Europe and Brazil; in fact, mainly through his second son, Miguel, nicknamed the "Grandfather of Europe:, his descendants nowadays rule in Belgium, Luxemburg, Liechtenstein, and were claimants to the thrones of Portugal, Austria, and the former Duchy of Parma.

This article deals with the children of John VI and in turn their senior heirs.

Background on John VI 

John, born on 13 May 1767 in Lisbon, was the second son of King Maria I and Pedro III.

Throne of Portugal 
When John was born, his brother, José, Prince of Brazil, was the heir to their mother, Maria I of Portugal. It was only after José's death by smallpox, in 1788, that John became the heir to the Portuguese throne. By this time, John was already  21 years old and he had not been groomed to become monarch, as his brother was so famously, and rigorously, done. He was said to have been uncultured, stupid, and ill-mannered, which worried the kingdom.

In 1799, John became Prince regent for his mother, who had been declared unable to reign, owing to her mental illness. At the same time, Napoleon Bonaparte had taken control of France through his coup-d'etat, the 18 Brumaire. Spain and France would soon sign a treaty and declare war and attempt to invade Portugal, starting the War of the Oranges. While peace was eventually attained, Portugal and its empire suffered territorial losses.

Portugal was the last country on the continent to not have joined the Continental System, John having tried to push his answer as long as he could. In 1807, France grew restless and finally sent troops on their way to Portugal, to force submission. To safeguard the House of Braganza and its rule over the Portuguese Empire, John moved the Portuguese court and capital to a safer location in the empire, Colonial Brazil. To satisfy the etiquette required by European society, John raised Brazil to a kingdom, forming the United Kingdom of Portugal, Brazil, and the Algarves.

In Rio de Janeiro, John established his court. In 1816, Maria I died and John was acclaimed King John VI of Portugal, Brazil, and the Algarves. By this time, Napoleon had been defeated and European courts demanded the return of the Portuguese court to Europe, which John eventually did, but leaving Pedro, Prince Royal as regent of Brazil. Refusing to return to Europe, Pedro declared Brazilian Independence.

When John died, a crisis of succession would occur over the Portuguese throne, a crisis fueled by John's children. It is John's eldest sons and granddaughter that would split the House of Braganza into three branches, the original House of Braganza, the Brazilian House of Braganza, and the Miguelist House of Braganza.

Descendants 
On 8 May 1785, John married Carlota Joaquina of Spain. The couple had 9 children.

Maria Teresa of Braganza, Princess of Beira

Francisco António of Braganza, Prince of Beira

Maria Isabel of Braganza

Pedro I & IV

As Pedro IV of Portugal (senior branch)

As Pedro I of Brazil (junior branch)

Maria Francisca of Braganza

Isabel Maria of Braganza

Miguel I of Portugal

Maria da Assunção of Braganza

Ana de Jesus Maria of Braganza

See also
Descendants of Manuel I of Portugal
Descendants of Miguel I of Portugal

Portuguese nobility
Portuguese royalty
House of Braganza
John VI of Portugal
John VI of Portugal